Violence (foaled March 21, 2010) is a multiple graded stakes winning American Thoroughbred racehorse who won the 2012 Grade I CashCall Futurity at Hollywood Park and Nashua Stakes at Aqueduct  as a two-year-old. He was retired prematurely after sustaining an injury and entered into a stud career at Hill 'n' Dale Farms in 2014.

Background

Violence was bred in Kentucky by Dell Ridge Farm, became the third male and ninth overall Grade I winner for his Medaglia d'Oro. A versatile stallion whose offspring have won events at the top level on dirt, turf, and synthetics, Medaglia d'Oro was tagged as a "filly sire" after 2009 Horse of the Year Rachel Alexandra, two-time champion filly Songbird and two-time Hong Kong Horse of the Year Golden Sixty.
Violence is the second foal of the Gone West mare Violent Beauty, her first being the winning Shakespeare colt Laertes. Herself a one-time winner from seven starts, Violent Beauty is out of the similar winner Storming Beauty (by Storm Cat), a full sister to 2005 Group III Stan James Horris Hill Stakes winner Hurricane Cat. As Gone West and Storm Cat were both produced from Secretariat mares, Violent Beauty is inbred 3x4 to the legendary champion. The dam of Storming Beauty is 1994 champion older female Sky Beauty, a winner of nine grade I events including the 1993 Triple Tiara.  

Violence was sold for $600,000 from consignment through agents Nick Sallusto and Hanzly Albina at the 2011 Keeneland September Yearling Sale to Steven Marshall's Black Rock Stable. Violence was trained by U.S. Racing Hall of Fame trainer Todd Pletcher.

Racing career

2012: two-year-old season
Violence began his career on August 18 at Saratoga in a Maiden Special Weight event for two-year-olds over a distance of seven furlongs in field of 8 of which five were first-starters including the future 2013 Kentucky Derby winner Orb. Violence started as the 4/5 odds-on favorite Violence hesitated at the start then was carried in, advanced between rivals near the five-eighths pole, moved to the outside shortly thereafter, chased the leader, went three wide on the turn, dropped to one off the rail approaching the quarter-pole, pursued Titletown Five. Drifting out inside the furlong marker, drew alongside Titletown Five, bumping him near the wire and narrowly prevailed by a neck with Orb finishing well in third place.

Violence missed some training time with a minor shin injury, and returned with three solid works on the training track at Belmont Park in October. His next start was on November 4 in the Grade II Nashua Stakes at Aqueduct over a mile. Trainer Pletcher also entered stablemate Darwin, a last start maiden winner who started as the 3/5 favorite and was in contention early. However, Violence handily defeated Vegas No Show with Really Sharp in third, five lengths behind the winner. The final time for the one-turn mile was 1:35.32 over a fast main track. Jockey Javier Castellano said, "He wanted to lean in a little, but once Javier got him corrected he finished well. He’s still a young colt, a colt I anticipate will continue to improve physically and mentally."  

Todd Pletcher wanting to give more time between races opted to pass the Remsen Stakes at Aqueduct and instead shipped Violence to the West Coast for the Grade I CashCall Futurity at Hollywood Park which was held on December 15. The field included Oxbow who previously won his maiden at Churchill Downs (and later in his three-year-old campaign would win the Preakness Stakes), He's Had Enough who had previously ran second beaten by a head in the Breeders' Cup Juvenile to Shanghai Bobby and GIII Hollywood Prevue Stakes winner Really Mr Greely. Nonetheless, Violence started as the 6/5 favorite and was ridden by Javier Castellano. Violence stalked mid-pack a bit off the rail as a fast pace developed as Fury Kapcori grabbed the early lead under Joe Talamo before Really Mr Greely took over on his outside while clearing the opening quarter in :22.97. The half went in :46.07. After angling to the inside behind the leaders on the clubhouse turn, Violence angled for room to the outside to reach contention rounding the far turn and challenged for the lead approaching mid-stretch. After getting the lead past the furlong mark, he was kept to the task by Castellano as Fury Kapcori continued to battle gamely along the inside. Violence went on to defeated Fury Kapcori by  lengths while completing the -mile distance in 1:43.50 over Hollywood's Cushion Track.

2013: three-year-old season
Todd Pletcher sent Violence to his training center at Palm Meadows in Florida after the CashCall Futurity victory for a short rest before preparing for his three-year-old campaign. Pletcher before the race said, "He's done really well so far and everything has gone according to plan while we've focused on getting him ready for the Fountain of Youth." The event, a Road to the Kentucky Derby qualification race attracted promising runners including allowance winners Cerro and Orb, as well as GIII Sam F. Davis Stakes winner Falling Sky and California shipper He's Had Enough from the barn of 2012 Kentucky Derby-winning trainer Doug O'Neill.  

Violence started as the 3/5 odds-on favorite chased the pace, eased out to rally three wide leaving the far turn and opened a clear lead in the stretch, then responded when Orb moved to the fore late and held on well while being beaten by half-a-length on to the wire in a time of 1:42.24 for the -mile distance. Violence, who spotted the winner six pounds while carrying top weight of 122 pounds. "We ended up being pretty close to a hot pace and as he tends to do, when he made the lead he kind of idles a little bit," Pletcher said of Violence. "His last race he did kind of the same thing where he waited on horses. You could see Orb coming with that long, sustained run and I think Violence was able to dig in pretty well actually in the stretch and we just came out on the short end."  

A week after the event it was announce that Violence had sustained a fracture to his right front medial sesamoid and had been retired from racing.
Connections were obviously disappointed with what had occurred and shipped the horse back to Kentucky for evaluation.

Statistics

Legend:

 
 

Notes:

An (*) asterisk after the odds means Violence was the post-time favourite.

Stud career
On July 16, 2013, Hill 'n' Dall Farms announced Violence would stand the 2014 breeding season for $15,000. In 2018 his stud fee was increased to $25,000. 

Violence has shuttled to Haras La Pasion in Argentina. To date he has two Group 1 winners from his offspring.

Notable progeny

c = colt, f = filly, g = gelding

Pedigree

References

2010 racehorse births
Racehorses bred in Kentucky
Racehorses trained in the United States
Thoroughbred family 1-g
American Grade 1 Stakes winners